Nick Fullwell (born 6 June 1969 in Wolverhampton) is an English professional darts player who plays for the Professional Darts Corporation  events.

Career
Fullwell joined the PDC circuit in 2005 and narrowly missed out qualifying for the World Grand Prix, losing in the final game to Gary Welding. After that, Fullwell struggled to progress in tournaments, failing to qualify for major tournaments, including the UK Open. It wasn't until the end of 2007 where Fullwell began showing some promise, reaching the last 16 in a Player Championship tournament in the Netherlands. He then reached the quarter-finals of the 2008 Bobby Bourn Memorial Trophy. Fullwell won qualification for the 2009 PDC World Darts Championship, defeating former world champion Richie Burnett along the way, eventually beating Ken Dobson to qualify. He faced 2005 finalist Mark Dudbridge in the first round but lost 3–2.

World Championship results

PDC
 2009: First round (lost to Mark Dudbridge 2–3)

BDO/WDF
 2020: First round (lost to David Evans 2–3)
 2022: Third round (lost to Neil Duff 1–3)

Performance timeline 

PDC European Tour

External links
Profile and stats on Darts Database

English darts players
Living people
1969 births
Professional Darts Corporation current tour card holders